This is a list of Serbian soldiers since the establishment of the Principality of Serbia. It only includes participants in wars.

Balkan Wars

David Albala
Ditko Aleksić
Miša Aleksić-Marinko
Jovan Atanacković
Jovan Babunski
Petar Bojović
Vukajlo Božović
Koporan Čauš
Ljuba Čupa
Dušan Dimitrijević
Jovan Dovezenski
Dragutin Jovanović-Lune
Svetomir Đukić
Spasa Garda
Jovan Grković-Gapon
Živko Gvozdić
Petko Ilić
Bogoljub Jevtić
Ljuba Jezdić
Danilo Kalafatović
Tasa Konević
Stojan Koruba
Radoje Ljutovac
Kosta Vojinović
Krsta Kovačević
Stanislav Krakov
Todor Krstić-Algunjski
Dimitrije Ljotić
Branislav Milosavljević
Aleksandar Mišić
Živojin Mišić
Jovan Naumović
Milutin Nedić
Stevan Nedić-Ćela
Borko Paštrović
Kosta Pećanac
Vojin Popović
Zafir Premčević
Radomir Putnik
Darko F. Ribnikar
Borisav Ristić
Sava Petrović-Grmija
Slobodan Šiljak
Stepa Stepanović
Dane Stojanović
Vojislav Tankosić
Toma Smiljanić-Bradina
Živko Topalović
Vasilije Trbić
Dragiša Vasić
Stanislav Vinaver
Janko Vukotić

World War I

David Albala (1886–1942), captain
Miša Aleksić-Marinko (1876–1923), lieutenant colonel
Jovan Atanacković (1848–1921), reserve general
Jovan Babunski (1878–1920), Chetnik commander
Theodore Bogdanovitch (1899–1956), volunteer
Petar Bojović (1858–1945), general
Boško Virjanac ( 1903–15), Chetnik
Vukajlo Božović (d. 1926), Chetnik commander
Koporan Čauš ( 1904–14), volunteer
Cene Marković (1864–1922), Chetnik
Dušan Dimitrijević (1882–1964), Chetnik
Jovan Dovezenski
Dragutin Jovanović-Lune
Momčilo Gavrić, child soldier
Dragutin Gavrilović, major
Bogoljub Ilić (1881–1956), detachment staff leader
Dragoljub Jeličić, child soldier
Bogoljub Jevtić
Ljuba Jezdić
Sofija Jovanović (1895–1979), soldier
Pavle Jurišić Šturm
Josif Mihajlović Jurukovski
Danilo Kalafatović
Sćepan Kecojević
Simo Kecojević
Ignjat Kirhner (1877–1944), volunteer, detachment commander
Tasa Konević
Stojan Koruba
Krsta Kovačević
Stanislav Krakov
Bogoljub Kujundžić
Radoje Ljutovac
Dimitrije Ljotić
Draža Mihailović
Branislav Milosavljević
Milan Milovanović (general)
Milutin Bojić
Milutin Krunich
Aleksandar Mišić
Živojin Mišić
Fehim Musakadić
Jovan Naumović
Milan Nedić
Milutin Nedić
Stevan Nedić-Ćela
Kosta Pećanac
Zafir Premčević
Adam Pribićević
Radomir Putnik
Aleksa Radovanović
Archibald Reiss (1875–1929), soldier 
Darko F. Ribnikar
Borisav Ristić
Sava Petrović-Grmija
Flora Sandes (1876–1956), sergeant major 
Milunka Savić
Stevan Simić
Ruth Stanley Farnam (1873–1946), volunteer 
Stepa Stepanović
Dragiša Stojadinović
Vojislav Tankosić
Slavka Tomić (ca. 1896–?), sergeant
Živko Topalović
Vasilije Trbić
Dimitrije Tucović
Dragiša Vasić
Miloš Vasić (general)
Rudolf Viest (1890–1945), soldier 
Kosta Vojinović
Janko Vukotić
Živko Gvozdić
Sreten Žujović

World War II
Nikola Stanimirović JNA Lt. Colonel (Commander - General) Novi Sad Yugoslavia

Yugoslav wars

See also
List of Serbian Revolutionaries (1804–15)
Yugoslav volunteers in the Spanish Civil War

References

Sources

Soldiers
List
Serbian